The Uganda Roads Fund (URF) is a government agency mandated to finance routine and periodic maintenance of public roads in Uganda. Established by an Act of Parliament in 2008, the agency raises monies through various means, independent of general government taxation regimes, and disburses those funds to repair and maintenance agencies, based on agreed work programmes.

Headquarters
The headquarters of the Uganda Road Fund are located on PPDA-Road Fund Towers, at Plot 39, Nakasero Road, on Nakasero Hill, in Kampala, Uganda's capital city. The geographical coordinates of URF headquarters are 0°19'35.934"N, 32°34'36.764"E (Latitude:0.3264539; Longitude:32.5771994).

Overview
The URF collects money from road users and attempts to equitably distribute those funds to repair and maintain public roads in an approximate ‘fee-for-service’ arrangement. The Fund is supposed to be independent of the general taxation mechanism of the government.

The agencies that repair and maintain Ugandan roads and therefore benefit from the monies accrued by URF include: (a) Uganda National Roads Authority (b) Kampala Capital City Authority (c) other designated agencies responsible for maintenance and repair of District, Urban and Community Access Roads.

Sources of funds
The various sources of revenue for URF include (i) fuel levies (ii) vehicular transit fees (iii) vehicular road licenses (iv) axle load fines (v) toll fees (vi) weight and distance charges on heavy commercial vehicles (vii) traffic and road safety fines.

Governance
The affairs of the agency are supervised by an 8-member board of directors:

 Mr Amajuru Simon Madraru: Chairperson
 Phoebe N Muathe: Member
 Hannington Ashaba: Member
 Dorothy Nseka Kiyaga: Member
 Tony B. Kavuma: Member 
 Gad Twesigye: Member
 Alex Onen: Member
 Andrew G Naimanye, PhD: Executive Director

See also
Transport in Uganda
List of roads in Uganda
 Uganda National Roads Authority
 Uganda Ministry of Works and Transport

References

External links
 Official website

Organisations based in Kampala
Government agencies of Uganda
Roads in Uganda
Organizations established in 2008
Transport organisations based in Uganda
2008 establishments in Uganda